This article is about the particular significance of the year 1621 to India and its people.

Events

 Battle of Rohilla
 10 year old Jai Singh I ascends to the throne as the Raja of Amber and the head of the Kachwaha Rajputs

Births

Deaths
 Nizamuddin Ahmad,  Muslim historian of late medieval India (born 1551)

See also

 Timeline of Indian history

References